Farsan or Pharsāṇ (Gujarati: ફરસાણ, Hindi and Marathi: फरसाण) refers to salty snacks originating from the Indian subcontinent. Farsans are a very important part of Marwari cuisine, Gujarati cuisine, Marathi cuisine and Sindhi cuisine, wherein a wide variety of them are prepared on special occasions and to entertain guests, and are also enjoyed with tea. Farsan is also found throughout the rest of India, particularly Maharashtra due to the influx of Gujarati and Rajasthani traders and migration of Sindhis in Mumbai.

Some are fried items which are then dried and can be stored; others are fresh or steamed.
The following are the main varieties of Farsan:
 Dhokla
 Fafda
 Khaman
 Chevdo (Bombay Mix)
 Chakri
 Bhajiya
 Khandvi
 Medu Vada
 Patras, Patarveliya
 Gathiya
 Mathiya
 Vanva
 Handvo
 Aloo Sev
 Besan Sev
 Dhebra
 Gota
 Bhakarwadi
 Masala Puri

History 
When India was undivided, the State of Sindh was under Bombay Presidency also called Bombay and Sindh. Due to its proximity with Gujarat, Rajasthan and political ties with then Bombay, it shared similar culinary traditions. Though Farsan is highly adopted in Gujarati cuisines but origin is same. Sindhis in Ulhasnagar have preserved this tradition in the form of few special dishes like Besan Papdi, Sev Dal Sandwich, Dahi Sev Puri, etc.

References 

4. http://sindhirasoi.com/recipe-index/breakfast/snacks/

Gujarati cuisine
Indian fast food
Indian snack foods
Sindhi cuisine